Mastacembelus tanganicae is a species of fish in the family Mastacembelidae. It is endemic to Lake Tanganyika where it occurs in shallow areas with a rocky substrate.

References

tanganicae
Fish of Lake Tanganyika
Taxonomy articles created by Polbot
Fish described in 1893
Taxa named by Albert Günther